Dr Kenneth Kaunda District Municipality (formerly Southern District Municipality) is one of the 4 districts of North West province of South Africa. The seat of Kaunda District is Klerksdorp. A plurality of its 742 821 people speak Setswana (2016 Census). The majority of its people live in the City of Matlosana Municipality. The district code is DC40. The district was formerly known as the Southern District Municipality. It is named after Kenneth Kaunda, the first President of Zambia.

Geography

Neighbours
The District borders both Gauteng and Free State Provinces. Dr Kenneth Kaunda District is surrounded (clockwise) by:
 Bojanala Platinum District Municipality  to the north
 West Rand District Municipality (Gauteng province) to the east
 Sedibeng District Municipality (Gauteng province) to the east
 Fezile Dabi District Municipality (Free State province) to the south-east
 Lejweleputswa District Municipality (Free State province) to the south
 Dr Ruth Segomotsi Mompati District Municipality to the south-west
 Ngaka Modiri Molema District Municipality to the north-west

Local municipalities
The district contains the following local municipalities:

After the 2016 Local Government elections, Tlokwe and Ventersdorp Local Municipalities were merged into the JB Marks Local Municipality.

Demographics
The following statistics are from the 2011 census.

Gender

Ethnic group

Age

Politics

Election results
Election results for Kaunda District in the South African general election, 2004. 
 Population 18 and over: 401 692 [66.99% of total population]
 Total votes: 226 396 [37.75% of total population]
 Voting % estimate: 56.36% votes as a % of population 18 and over

References

External links
 Dr. Kenneth Kaunda District Municipality website

District Municipalities of North West (South African province)
Dr Kenneth Kaunda District Municipality